By Default is the fourth studio album by British rock band Band of Skulls, released on 27 May 2016 through BMG as the band's first release by a major label. The album was the last album to feature drummer Matt Hayward before his departure in 2017.

Reception

By Default has received mixed to negative reviews from critics with many criticising the album of being forgettable and lacking excitement. Drowned in Sound were especially critical of the album's lyrics, which were described as "misogynistic" and making "fuck all sense". However, in a positive review, Classic Rock Magazine praised the album's use of synthesizers and wide variety of influences including Iggy Pop and T Rex.

Track listing

Personnel
 Russell Marsden – vocals, guitar
 Emma Richardson – bass guitar, vocals
 Matt Hayward – drums
 Tom Coyne – mastering
 Gil Norton – production, mixing

Charts

References

2016 albums
Band of Skulls albums
Dance-rock albums
Albums recorded at Rockfield Studios